Opera School is a Canadian short documentary film, directed by Gudrun Parker and released in 1952. The film traces the education of an opera singer studying at The Royal Conservatory of Music, climaxing in her debut singing the role of Susanna in The Marriage of Figaro.

The film won the Canadian Film Award for Best Theatrical Short Film at the 4th Canadian Film Awards in 1952.

References

External links

Opera School at the National Film Board of Canada

1952 films
Canadian short documentary films
Best Theatrical Short Film Genie and Canadian Screen Award winners
National Film Board of Canada short films
1952 short films
Documentary films about music and musicians
1950s short documentary films
Canadian black-and-white films
1950s English-language films
1950s Canadian films